Reino Aarnio AIA (December 8, 1912 – February 12, 1988) was an American architect based in New York City who practiced in the mid to late twentieth century in New Jersey and New York under his own name as Reino Aarnio, established in 1948.

Early life and education
Born in December 8, 1912 in Turku, Finland, Aarnio emigrated to the United States in 1920. He earned his bachelor of architecture from New York University in 1938, graduating cum laude. He won the F.B. Morse Prize in 1935 and the Sherrill Prize in 1936.

Architectural career
Aarnio joined the American Institute of Architects New York Chapter in 1948 and established his own firm that year. In 1967, he was an associate professor at the New York Institute of Technology. He was also the chairman of the Arts and Architecture committee of the Finlandia Foundation from 1960; the vice chairman of the Zoning Board of Appeals, River Edge, New Jersey, from 1965; architectural consultant for the American-Scandinavian Foundation Scholarship Awards Committee from 1965; and liaison as the planning board of River Edge, New Jersey, from 1969.

Awards and publications
Aarnio received a Citation for Excellence for the U.S. Exhibition in Sweden, Poland and Greece, Veterans of Foreign Wars in 1959. He was knighted by Government of Finland in 1963. He received a Best Municipal Library Award for Paramus Public Library, Paramus, New Jersey in the Book of
the Month Club, 1965. He was published in numerous articles, which featured contributions on architecture and design in books and magazines. He was a member of the Board of Trustees for the Scandinavian Seminar for University Level Studies in Scandinavia from 1959.

Personal life

Reino Aarnio was married to Sylvia (Bachman) Aarnio, a coloratura soprano and graduate of the Juilliard School of Music.

Works
1956: U.S. Exhibit for the St. Eric's Trade Fair in Stockholm, Sweden 
1956: U.S. Administration Building, Library And Exhibition Hall [Stockholm, Sweden) 
1957: U.S. Exhibit at the International Trade Fair in Poznan, Poland 
1958: U.S. Administration Building, Library and Exhibition in Poznan, Poland
1959: U.S. Administration Building, Library and Exhibition Hall [Salonika, Greece]  
1960: River Edge, NJ, Public Library [River Edge, NJ] 
1963: Hawaiian Pavilion, New York World's Fair, Flushing Meadow, NY 
1963: River Edge Reform Temple and School, River Edge, New Jersey
1965: Paramus Public Library, Paramus, New Jersey in the Book of the Month Club.
1968: Immanuel Lutheran Church School, Whitestone, New York
1969: Embassy of Finland to the UN, New York City
1969: Lincoln Park Public Library, Lincoln Park, New Jersey

References

1912 births
1988 deaths
People from Turku
People from River Edge, New Jersey
Reino Aarnio
Finnish emigrants to the United States
Architects from New York City
New York University alumni
American ecclesiastical architects
Architects of Lutheran churches
20th-century American architects
New York Institute of Technology faculty
Reino Aarnio
Reino Aarnio